The large-eared  slit-faced bat (Nycteris macrotis), is a species of slit-faced bat which lives in forests and savannas throughout Africa. Nycteris vinsoni was once considered a synonym of N. macrotis, but it became recognized as a separate species in 2004. Some, however, still consider N. vinsoni to be a subspecies of N. macrotis, and consider N. macrotis a species complex.

Three subspecies have been identified: N. m. aethiopica, N. m. luteola, and N. m. macrotis.

References

Bats of Africa
Nycteridae
Mammals described in 1876
Taxa named by George Edward Dobson